The Al-Adl cemetery is one of the earliest and largest and of six resting places in Mecca. It is also the second substantial cemetery in the city.

History and location
The graveyard was opened in 1926, and its size is around 50,000 square meters. The cemetery is on Majed Street in Mecca. It is near Masjid Al Haram that is located at northeast. The cemetery is also near Makkah governorate headquarters that is at east side.

Burials
Many eminent Saudi royals were interred in the al-Adl cemetery, including Prince Nayef, Prince Mansour, Prince Mishari, Prince Majid, Prince Fawwaz, Prince Sattam, Prince Abdullah Al Faisal Al Saud, Prince Fahd bin Saud and Prince Saud bin Faisal Al Saud.

In addition to Saudi royals, other senior figures, including Abdulaziz ibn Abdullah ibn Baaz and Muhammad ibn al-Uthaymeen were also buried in the graveyard. Additionally, the cemetery has been used as a resting place for former imams of Masjid Al Haram.

References

External links
 

1926 establishments in Saudi Arabia
Buildings and structures in Mecca
Burial sites of the House of Saud
Cemeteries in Saudi Arabia
Sunni cemeteries